George William Henry Dunstan (19 July 1904 – 29 June 1965) was an Australian rules footballer who played with St Kilda in the Victorian Football League (VFL).

Notes

External links 

1904 births
1965 deaths
Australian rules footballers from Victoria (Australia)
St Kilda Football Club players